The Indian Multi Role Helicopter (IMRH) is a medium-lift helicopter currently under development by Hindustan Aeronautics Limited (HAL) for Indian Armed forces for air assault, air-attack, anti-submarine, anti-surface, military transport and VIP transport roles. IMRH is aimed to replace all the current Mil Mi-17 and Mil Mi-8 helicopters across the Indian armed forces.

The planned rotorcraft is expected to have a maximum takeoff weight of 13 tonnes with a five bladed main rotor and 4 bladed rotor on tail. The navalised version further will have longer range and higher payload capacity. HAL estimates requirement of over 314 rotocraft of same class across Indian Armed Forces replace existing Mil Mi-17 helicopters in service in India.

The scaled model tests of the helicopter have been ongoing as of 2021 while first flight of a full prototype is expected in 2025-26. The introduction into armed forces thereafter is expected in 2028 after two years of testing. A total of six prototypes are planned for trials before production.

Development

Origins
During the late 2000s, Indian aerospace manufacturer Hindustan Aeronautics Limited (HAL), which was interested in expanding their rotorcraft offering beyond that of the existing HAL Dhruv programme, began to explore the potential for the production of a conceptual 10-tonne class helicopter; this concept came to be known as the Medium Lift Helicopter (MLH). If produced, the 10-tonne MLH shall hold the distinction of being the largest rotary-wing aircraft to have ever been produced by India. Early on, it was recognised that the type would be primarily marketed towards military customers, especially the Indian armed forces, and that the tentative programme would greatly benefit from the involvement of a foreign manufacturer in a partnership arrangement.

Speaking in September 2008 on the company's ambitions for the MLH, HAL Chairman Ashok Baweja stated: "We plan to develop and build 10-tonne class helicopters in partnership with either the Eurocopter or the Russians... This would be a joint venture between the selected company and HAL". At this point, there were public estimates of producing around 350 helicopters in the 10-tonne class, which was dependent upon the military market for medium-lift helicopters. HAL were also keen to explore the potential for export sales of the MLH, the prospects of which being recognised to greatly depend upon the foreign partner select to participate in the programme.

During the late 2000s, HAL issued a formal invitation for bids from major rotorcraft manufacturers across the world to co-develop the MLH. However, during July 2009, HAL reportedly cancelled its active tender for the helicopter's co-development; by this stage, both Eurocopter and Mil Helicopters had been shortlisted as potential technology and investment partners. Allegedly, HAL informed the two companies that the tender had been scrapped because of the qualitative requirements of the armed forces having substantially changed. Speaking at a national seminar held in December 2014, HAL's chief test pilot, Wing Commander Unnikrishna Pillai, gave a talk on the design challenges posed development of medium and heavy lift helicopters in India. He said that, following on from the expertise gained in earlier projects, the Rotary Wing Research and Design Centre (RWR&DC) of HAL has become confident and is well poised to develop medium lift helicopters.

Relaunch
During early 2017, HAL reportedly re-launched its MLH proposal, now seeking to produce a 12-tonne twin-engine multipurpose helicopter; a new project name, the Indian Multi-Role Helicopter (IMRH) was also applied to the programme. The IMRH has been conceived for performing various missions, including troop transport, combat search and rescue, VVIP transport, ground and offshore operations, air ambulance, casualty evacuation, and cargo carriage, including under-slung loads. It is to be capable of flying at altitudes of up to 20,000 feet while transporting either a maximum of 24 personnel or a payload of 3,500 kg. According to HAL, the proposed helicopter can lift double the capacity that is currently available using its Dhruv advanced light helicopter, which falls within the five-tonne class. One HAL official stated that the Indian Army is estimated to require up to 400 helicopters within the MLH's class.

During February 2017, a full-scale mock up of the MRH was publicly displayed at Aero India 2017; according to a HAL spokesman, the mock up was largely based upon the existing Russian Mil Mi-17. By this point, HAL anticipated the first flight of the helicopter to occur during 2019; however, the engine to power the MRH was yet to be finalised. Likewise, the rotorcraft's finer details have yet to be fully defined, and are to only be finalised after specifications have been received from the intended users. Additionally, operator acceptance trials have been expected to take about 7-8 years before induction. In February 2017, the MLH proposal remained in the conceptual stage; it was yet to be cleared by HAL's board; accordingly, at the time, it was yet to commence formal design work. The intended engines to power the type are yet to be identified, while the helicopter is intended to be equipped with automatic flight control system, modern mission systems, advanced cockpit displays, and other contemporary avionics. At the time, HAL is in the process of developing a large, ₹600-crore helicopter manufacturing complex in Tumakuru; this is to be the hub of the company's rapidly expanding rotorcraft division.

During May 2017, HAL issued requests for information (ROIs) in regards to elements of the Indian Multi-Role Helicopter (IMRH); the requests involved the turboshaft engines, along with assistance in the development of a blade-folding mechanism and external reviews of the rotorcraft’s landing gear and transmission. The landing gear is planned to be retractable and use an active steering system and self-centering capability, while the engines are to be imported, equipped with dual-channel full authority digital electronic controls (FADEC) and be capable of above-average high-altitude performance. Both the main and tail rotors are to be made of composite materials and are to be coated with radar absorbent/infrared resistant paints.

In 2021, details on progress were unveiled in Aero India. The helicopter is expected to have a maximum take off weight of 13 tonnes and will have 24 to 36 crews onboard in various configurations. The helicopter will have a five bladed main rotor with a diameter of 21.2 meters and a four-blade tail rotor. MRH will have 75% domestic content but will use an imported 2000kW turboshaft engine. The aircraft passed preliminary design phase in 2021 and expects approval for further development by late 2021 or early 2022. First flight is expected 4 years after development project began while the introduction is scheduled for 2028.

By 2021, the scale models have been undergoing trials, the flight of a full-sized prototype is expected in 2025-2026 ahead of the type's intended induction into the armed forces. A specialised version for the Indian Navy will further be developed with greater range, a higher payload capacity and furnishings for maritime operations. Till 30 March 2022, HAL completed preliminary design work and is ready for prototype development.

Manufacturing 
HAL is setting up a new Helicopter Factory at Tumkur that will produce helicopters of 3 ton to 12 ton category. IMRH will be the first major project to follow new manufacturing policy under Defence Acquisition Procedure (DAP) 2020. As per the policy, a private sector entity will form Special Purpose Vehicle (SPV) with HAL by acquiring 51% stake after getting minimum order assurance from Indian Armed Forces. During delivery, the company will be free to export 25% of the production to third country. An estimated ₹11,000 crore will be required as development cost for seven years and another ₹12,000 crore for setting up manufacturing facilities. The total requirement of Indian Armed Forces is 550 units.

On 6 February 2023, Prime Minister Narendra Modi dedicated HAL Helicopter Factory at Tumakuru to the nation. The facility will have capacity to produce 1,000 helicopters of 3-15 tonne category and will meet the entire requirement of the country without import. The factory will not only produce Light Utility Helicopter, Light Combat Helicopter, IMRH, Advance Light Helicopter, but will also act as Maintenance, Repair and Overhaul facility.

HAL-Safran Joint Venture 
HAL started discussion with Safran Helicopter Engines for joint development and manufacturing of IMRH engine under strategic partnership model. On 8 July 2022, HAL signed memorandum of understanding (MoU) with Safran Helicopter Engines to form joint venture company that will be dedicated to the development, production, sales and support of new generation helicopter engine for IMRH including the naval variant. The company will also meet the requirement of future helicopter projects of HAL and Ministry of Defence. HAL will hold the type certificate for the engine after development is complete, which will take three years. On 15 February 2023, HAL and Safran signed work share agreement for joint development of engine.

Operational history
During 2008, HAL stated that it intends to offer the 10-tonne MLH to the Indian Navy for the purpose of meeting its established requirement for a fleet of heavy-lift helicopters. According to an official statement made during early 2017: “HAL will target export orders, aiming to replace ageing fleet of similar class of helicopters that are operational in more than 40 air forces”. As of 2017, a total of four distinct versions of the MRH have been planned, including a navalised maritime variant and a civilian-orientated model, for which HAL intends to achieve civil certification of.

HAL has commented that the company has been examining the prospects of the indigenously-developed MLH essentially replacing the Mi-17 helicopters that are in widespread use both abroad and in India, especially by its heavy use by most frontline operations by the Indian Air Force; possessing broadly specifications, the fledgling rotorcraft is to be capable of performing a greater number of roles than the Russian Mi-17. While there has been no officially-stated requirement for a 10-12 tonne rotorcraft; however, the company has intentions for the IMRH to ultimately start replacing India's older Mi-17s after 2025.

On 5 August 2019, it was reported that the process for securing government approvals for the helicopter has started. Full scale work will commence as soon as the project is approved, with first flight expected in two years. The requirement for such helicopters is reportedly of around 550 units.

In July 2021, the Indian Navy formally involved itself in the project, envisaging a navalised version of the helicopter for anti-submarine and anti-surface warfare roles. As the naval variant will not perform high-altitude operations, unlike Indian Army and Indian Air Force operations, it will have higher payload capacity and longer range. It is anticipated that the navalised version will have dedicated equipment for the role, including sonar and sea-scanner radar with a customised cockpit.

Specifications (projected)

See also

References

Indian helicopters
Indian military aircraft procurement programs
Military helicopters